Telegrafberget, Tyresö has the highest point in Tyresö Municipality, Sweden, 84 m (276 ft) above sea level. On the top of it there is a watchtower with a view all the way to central Stockholm, Dalarö and Gustavsberg. Telegrafberget is located on the Brevik peninsula.

The hill is called Telegrafberget (Telegraph hill) because a station for optical telegraph was located there in the 19th century.

External links
 Tyresö kommuns webbplats – Telegrafberget

Tyresö Municipality
Landforms of Stockholm County
Hills of Sweden